Charols is a commune in the Drôme department in southeast France.

Population

See also
Communes of the Drôme department

References

Communes of Drôme